Aleksander Kitewski (born 14 February 1996) is a Polish sprint canoeist.

He competed at the 2021 ICF Canoe Sprint World Championships, winning a silver medal in the C-4 500 m distance.

References

External links

1996 births
Living people
Polish male canoeists
ICF Canoe Sprint World Championships medalists in Canadian